Raúl Eduardo Iturriaga Neumann (born 23 January 1938) is a Chilean Army general and a former deputy director of the DINA, the Chilean secret police under the Augusto Pinochet military dictatorship. He was in charge of a secret detention center known as La Venda Sexy ("Sexy Blindfold") and La Discothèque—because of the sexual abuse inflicted on blindfolded prisoners as loud music masked their screams. An aide to General Manuel Contreras, head of the DINA, he was in charge of several assassinations carried out as part of Operation Condor. He has been condemned in absentia in Italy for the failed murder of Christian-Democrat Bernardo Leighton, and is wanted both in Spain and in Argentina. In the latter country, he is accused of the assassination of General Carlos Prats.

In June 2007 Iturriaga went into hiding to escape a 10-year prison sentence handed down by judge Alejandro Solís (reduced to five years by the Chilean Supreme Court) for the forced disappearance of Revolutionary Left Movement member Luis San Martín. He was finally captured in August 2007 in Viña del Mar.

Life and career 
Raúl Iturriaga became an instructor in counter-insurgency after following courses with his future chief, Manuel Contreras, in Fort Gulick, an installation of the United States Department of Defense School of the Americas based in the Panama Canal. He joined the DINA in November 1973, less than three months after Pinochet's coup against Salvador Allende. First responsible for the Department of Exterior Affairs of the DINA, he was named head of the Brigada Purén, based in the torture center Villa Grimaldi, in December 1975.

He attended a special military course again in Panama in 1976. Iturriaga became vice-director of intelligence in DINA in 1977, before also taking charge of its economic department, responsible for firms owned by DINA.

Iturriaga was responsible for Operation Colombo, during which political opponents "disappeared" in Argentina while Santiago claimed they had killed themselves as a result of political in-fighting. Although he officially retired in 1991, an association of victims claims that he has maintained links with DINE, DINA's successor.

Criminal prosecution 
In 1989, before the transition to democracy, Iturriaga was elevated to the highest grade of general in the Chilean Armed Forces, with his base in Iquique. He officially retired in 1991 as general. The same year, he was interrogated by Minister Adolfo Bañados concerning the DINA's role in the assassination of Orlando Letelier, Salvador Allende's former minister, in Washington, D.C.

In 1995, Iturriaga was also sentenced to 18 years' imprisonment in Italy for the 1975 failed assassination attempt against Christian Democrat Bernardo Leighton in Rome, in part because of the testimony supplied by Michael Townley.

In 2002, he was indicted for the "disappearance" of Víctor Olea in September 1974.

The following year he was indicted by magistrate Alejandro Solís, along with his former chief Manuel Contreras and General Pedro Espinoza, for the assassination of General Carlos Prats and his wife in Buenos Aires on 30 September 1974. He is also claimed by the Spanish magistrate Baltasar Garzón. The Prats case, part of Operation Condor, opened up in Chile following an extradition request made by the Argentine magistrate María Servini de Cubría. 

The former vice-head of staff of the Chilean Army, General Guillermo Garín, who was also Pinochet's spokesman, gave his support to Iturriaga following his escape on 11 June 2007. Iturriaga had been sentenced to five years for the kidnapping of Luis Dagoberto San Martín, a 21-year-old opponent of Pinochet who "disappeared" in a DINA detention centre in 1974. In a June 2007 video broadcast, Iturriaga stated: "I openly rebel before this arbitrary, biased, unconstitutional and anti-judicial conviction."

Head of DINA Manuel Contreras has been the only other general to have contested the Chilean justice during democratic rule. Contreras was on the run from justice for two months, taking refuge in the south and then in a military regiment, before being captured by security forces and detained. However, various deputies, including Isabel Allende (PS), Antonio Leal (PPD), Tucapel Jiménez (PPD), and also Iván Moreira (UDI), have condemned Iturriaga's flight from justice. Jiménez warned of the existence of a "network" of protectors, as did Jaime Naranjo (PS).

On 2 August 2007, Iturriaga was captured in the Pacific coastal city of Viña del Mar. Judge Alejandro Solis explained that no investigation would be opened on his disappearance, as it is not considered a crime in Chilean law to disappear when one is on parole, which Iturriaga was until June 2007. He was sent to the Penal Cordillera prison in the Valparaíso Region, located in a military property. Left-wing deputies of the Concertación, such as Carlos Montes (PS) and Denisse Pascal (PS), requested his transfer to the Punta Peuco prison, considered as more tightly guarded and where condemned military personnel would enjoy less freedom of action than in the military prison. Adriana Muñoz compared the Penal Cordillera prison to the "Bermuda Triangle", because from there people disappeared just like if they had been kidnapped by UFOs." Francisco Encina (PS) considered it strange that one of the defenders of Iturriaga, the UDI senator and former head of staff of the Chilean Navy, Jorge Arancibia, was a representative of the Valparaíso Region where Iturriaga has been detained. 

On 2 June 2017, Iturriaga was among 106 former intelligence officers who Chilean Judge Hernan Cristoso sentenced to prison for the kidnapping and murder of 16 leftist activists in 1974 and 1975.

See also 
 Chile under Pinochet
 Chilean transition to democracy

References 

1938 births
1975 crimes in Chile
Chilean Army generals
Chilean assassins
Chilean criminals
Chilean anti-communists
Chilean people of Basque descent
Chilean people of German descent
Chilean prisoners and detainees
Dirty wars
Failed assassins
Living people
People convicted of attempted murder
People from Linares
People of the Dirección de Inteligencia Nacional
Prisoners and detainees of Chile